The 1989 African Championships in Athletics were held in Lagos, Nigeria between 4 and 8 August.

Medal summary

Men's events

Women's events

Medal table

See also
1989 in athletics (track and field)

External links
Results – GBR Athletics

A
African Championships in Athletics
A
African Championships in Athletics
20th century in Lagos
1989 in Nigerian sport
International athletics competitions hosted by Nigeria
August 1989 sports events in Nigeria